CBGB OMFUG Masters: Live June 29, 2001: The Bowery Collection is the first live album by American garage rock band The Mooney Suzuki, released on March 18, 2008.

Track listing
"It's Showtime, Pt. 1" – 1:59
"In a Young Man's Mind" – 2:57
"Singin' a Song About Today" – 4:03
"Natural Fact" – 2:52
"Everything's Gone Wrong" – 1:56
"Half of My Heart" – 4:53
"Oh Sweet Susanna" – 3:20
"Make My Way" – 3:30
"A Little Bit of Love" – 3:03
"I Woke Up This Mornin'" – 4:00

Personnel
The Mooney Suzuki
Sammy James Jr. – vocals, guitar
Graham Tyler – guitar
John Paul Ribas – bass
Will Rockwell-Scott – drums
Additional personnel
John Joh – design
Dustin Pittman – photography
"Handsome Dick" Manitoba – liner notes

References

The Mooney Suzuki albums
2008 live albums
Albums recorded at CBGB